Alfredo Malabello (born 11 December 1959) is an Australian singer and actor, who released two studio albums and whose acting credits include the SBS series, Carla Cametti PD (2008), Nine Network's Underbelly Files (2011) and Seven Network's The Secret Daughter (2016).

Life and career
He went to private colleges and studied at the Institute of Technology and attained a electronics degree and electromechanics and physics.

In 1980, Malabello formed a band called The Rhythms. The Rhythms supported The Cure on their first tour of Australia and toured around Australia for four years before breaking up.

In 1988, Malabello travelled the world with his musical partner and signed a deal with Polygram in Tokyo, Japan. They relocated to New York and then Nashville, Tennessee, for one year and recorded an album.

In 2010, Malabello released his debut solo album, Ciao Bella which peaked at number 83 on the ARIA Charts. In 2011, Malabello said "I was pleasantly surprised with the success of Ciao Bella, and I'm thrilled I'm able to connect with so many people."

This was followed by The Two of Us in 2011, self-described as "a fun introduction, a seduction, a courtship, foreplay, right through some slow whisper pillow talk."

Discography

Albums

External links

References

Living people
Australian male singer-songwriters
Australian singers of Italian descent
1959 births